The Gwangju Uprising was a popular uprising in the city of Gwangju, South Korea, from May 18 to May 27, 1980, which pitted local, armed citizens against soldiers and police of the South Korean government. The event is sometimes called 5·18 (May 18), in reference to the date the movement began. The uprising is also known as the Gwangju Democratization Struggle, the Gwangju Massacre, the May 18 Democratic Uprising, or the May 18 Gwangju Democratization Movement.

The uprising began after local Chonnam University students who were demonstrating against the martial law government were fired upon, killed, raped, and beaten by government troops. Some Gwangju citizens took up arms, raiding local police stations and armouries, and were able to take control of large sections of the city before soldiers re-entered the city and put down the uprising. At the time, the South Korean government reported estimates of around 170 people killed, but other estimates have measured 600 to 2,300 people killed. During Chun Doo-hwan's unelected presidency, the authorities defined the incident by classifying it as the ''Gwangju Riot,'' and claimed that it was being instigated by "communist sympathizers and rioters", possibly acting on the support of the North Korean government.

Denial of or support for the Gwangju Uprising has long acted as a litmus test for determining conservative and far-right groups and beliefs, and mainstream and progressive sectors of the population, within modern Korean politics. The far-right groups have sought to discredit the uprising. One such argument points to the fact that it occurred before Chun Doo-hwan officially took office, and so contends that it could not really have been a simple student protest against him that started it. However, Chun Doo-hwan had become the de facto leader of South Korea at that time since coming into power on December 12, 1979, after leading a successful military coup against the previous South Korean government which was itself also authoritarian.

In 1997, a national cemetery and day of commemoration (May 18), along with acts to "compensate, and restore honor" to victims, were established. Later investigations would confirm various atrocities which had been committed by the army. In 2011, 1980 Archives for the May 18th Democratic Uprising against Military Regime located in Gwangju's city hall were inscribed on the UNESCO Memory of the World Register.

Background 
A series of democratic movements in South Korea began with the assassination of President Park Chung-hee on October 26, 1979. The abrupt termination of Park's 18-year authoritarian rule left a power vacuum and led to political and social instability. While President Choi Kyu-hah, the successor to the Presidency after Park's death, had no dominant control over the government, South Korean Army major general Chun Doo-hwan, the chief of the Defense Security Command, seized military power through the Coup d'état of December Twelfth and tried to intervene in domestic issues. The military however could not explicitly reveal its political ambitions and had no obvious influence over the civil administration before the mass civil unrest in May 1980.

The nation's democratization movements, which had been suppressed during Park's tenure, were being revived. With the beginning of a new semester in March 1980, professors and students expelled for pro-democracy activities returned to their universities, and student unions were formed. These unions led nationwide demonstrations for reforms, including an end to martial law (declared after Park's assassination), democratization, human rights, minimum wage demands, and freedom of the press. These activities culminated in the anti-martial law demonstration at Seoul Station on May 15, 1980, in which about 100,000 students and citizens participated.

In response, Chun Doo-hwan took several suppressive measures. On February 18, 1980, a riot control training order was issued to several units (such as the Capital Garrison Command, ROK-SWC) by ROK Army Headquarters. This riot control training, called "Chungjeong Training", was harsh and unconscionable, including the prohibition of furlough and oppressive mind training. Consequently, Chungjeong Training was criticized as one of the important reasons that ROK-SWC Paratroopers behaved irrationally (using indiscriminate violence against citizens and even Local Police officers without proper reason) during the Uprising. 

On May 17, Chun forced the Cabinet to extend martial law to the whole nation, which had previously not applied to Jeju Province. The extended martial law closed universities, banned political activities, and further curtailed the press. To enforce martial law, troops were dispatched to the country's main cities. On the same day, the Defense Security Command raided a national conference of student union leaders from the current 55 universities in South Korea, who were gathered to discuss their next moves in the wake of the May 15 demonstration. Twenty-six politicians, including South Jeolla Province native and future president of the country Kim Dae-jung, were also arrested on charges of instigating demonstrations.  What is often not mentioned is how Chun played down the protests by cutting off all communication to and from Gwangju and using propaganda to inform the rest of the nation that the protestors in Gwangju were all communists.

Ensuing strife was focused in South Jeolla Province, particularly in the then-provincial capital, Gwangju, for complex political and geographical reasons. These factors were both deep and contemporary:
[The Jeolla, or Honam] region is the granary of Korea. However, due to its abundant natural resources, the Jeolla area has historically been the target of exploitation by both domestic and foreign powers.

The oppositional protest had existed in Korea historicallyespecially in the South Jeolla Province regionduring the Donghak Peasant Revolution, Gwangju Student Independence Movement, Yeosu–Suncheon Rebellion, regional resistance to the Japanese invasions of Korea (1592–1598), and more recently under the Third Republic of South Korea and Fourth Republic of South Korea, as can be seen by the excerpts below:

Park Chung Hee's dictatorship had showered economic and political favors on his native Gyeongsang Province in the southeast, at the expense of the Jeolla region of the southwest. The latter became the real hotbed of political opposition to the dictatorship, which in turn led to more discrimination from the centre. Finally, in May 1980 the city of Gwangju in South Jeolla province exploded in a popular uprising against the new military strongman, General Chun Doo Hwan, who responded with a bloodbath that killed hundreds of Gwangju's citizens.
The city of Kwangju was subject to particularly severe and violent repression by the military after [nationwide] martial law was imposed. The denial of democracy and the heightening authoritarianism that accompanied the coming to power of Chun Doo Hwan to replace Park prompted nationwide protests which, because of Cholla's [Jeolla's] historical legacy of dissent and radicalism, were most intense in that region.

Uprising

May 18–21 

On the morning of May 18, students gathered at the gate of Chonnam National University in defiance of its closing. By 9:30 am, around 200 students had arrived and were opposed by 30 paratroopers. At around 10 am, soldiers and students clashed: soldiers charged against the students; students threw stones in retaliation. The protest then moved to the downtown area, Geumnamno (the street leading to the Jeollanamdo Provincial Office). There the conflict broadened to around 2000 participants by the afternoon. Initially, police handled the Geumnamno protests; but by 4 pm, the ROK Special Warfare Command (SWC) sent paratroopers to take over. The arrival of these 686 soldiers, from the 33rd and 35th battalions of the 7th Airborne Brigade, marked a new, violent, and now infamous phase of suppression.

Witnesses say soldiers clubbed both demonstrators and onlookers unreasonably. Testimonies, photographs, and internal records attest to the use of bayonets. To make things worse, paratroopers would break into building  irrelevant to the demonstration; including hotels, cafés, and barbershops; and attacked, tortured, or sometimes killed the citizens indiscriminately. The first known fatality was a 29-year-old deaf man named Kim Gyeong-cheol, who was clubbed to death on May 18 while passing by the scene without any hostile intent. As citizens were infuriated by the violence of these ROK-SWC paratroopers, the number of protesters rapidly increased and exceeded 10,000 by May 20.

As the conflict escalated, the army began to open fire on the citizens, killing an unknown number of protesters near Gwangju station on May 20. That same day, angered protesters burned down the local MBC television station, which had misreported the situation that had unfolded in Gwangju (acknowledging only one civilian casualty, for example). Four policemen were killed at a police barricade near the Provincial Government Building after a car drove into them.

On the night of May 20, hundreds of taxis led a large parade of buses, trucks, and cars toward the Provincial Office to join the protest. These "drivers of democracy" showed up to support the citizens and the demonstration because of troop brutality witnessed earlier in the day. As the drivers joined in the demonstration, troops fired tear gas on them, pulled them out of their vehicles and beat them. This in turn led more drivers to arrive at the scene in anger after many taxi drivers were assaulted while trying to assist the injured and take people to the hospital. Some were shot after the drivers attempted to use the vehicles as weapons or to block soldiers.

The violence climaxed on May 21. At about 1 pm, the army fired at a protesting crowd gathered in front of the South Jeolla Provincial Office building, causing numerous casualties. In response, some protesters raided Reserve Force armories and police stations in nearby towns and armed themselves with M1 rifles or M1/M2 carbines. The militias also started to exercise caution against perceived North Korean provocateurs, such as raising placards that say "Don't misjudge, Northerners (북괴는 오판말라)"  Later that afternoon, bloody gunfights between civilian militias and the army broke out in the Provincial Office Square. By 5:30 pm, militias had acquired two light machine guns and used them against the army, which began to retreat from the downtown area.

May 22–25

Blockade of Gwangju, and further atrocities 
At this point, all troops retreated to rural outskirt areas outside of the main city to wait for reinforcements, including troops from the 3rd Airborne Brigade, 11th Airborne Brigade, 20th Mechanised Infantry Division, and 31st Infantry Division, and Combat Arms Training Command (CATC,  - currently known as the ROK Army Training & Doctrine Command), especially CATC's three subordinate units came from their HQ Located in Sangmudae military complex - Army Infantry School, Army Artillery School, and Army Armor School.

The army blocked all routes and communications leading into and out of the city. Although there was a lull in fighting between militias and the army, more casualties were incurred on May 23 when soldiers fired at a bus that attempted to break out of the city in Jiwon-dong, killing 15 of the 18 passengers, and summarily executing two wounded passengers. 

The following day, on May 24, two teenage boys, Jeon Jae-su and Bang Gwang-beom attempted to swim across the Wonje reservoir, but the 11th Airborne Brigade Troopers opened fire on them, resulting in their deaths at 13:50 p.m.. At 13:55 p.m., the army suffered the most casualties when troops of the 11th Airborne Brigade 63rd Special Operations Battalion and CATC Army Infantry School Training Battalion mistakenly fired at each other in Songam-dong, resulting in the deaths of 13 soldiers. The 11th Airborne Brigade Troopers indiscriminately murdered unarmed civilians and residents near the village in Songam-dong and plundered nearby stores. Martial Law Command misinterpreted friendly fire at Songam-dong as the work of insurgents within the army, as Airborne Brigade Troopers were using a different communications channel.

Settlement Committees 
Meanwhile, in the "liberated" city of Gwangju, the Citizens' Settlement Committee and the Students' Settlement Committee were formed. The former was composed of about 20 preachers, lawyers, and professors. They negotiated with the army, demanding the release of arrested citizens, compensation for victims, and prohibition of retaliation in exchange for the disarmament of militias. The latter was formed by university students and took charge of funerals, public campaigns, traffic control, withdrawal of weapons, and medical aid.

 Kim Jong-bae(김종배) : Chief Executive
 Heo Kyu-jeong(허규정) : Secretary of Home Affairs, handled the City Hall, service for public's welfare, funeral
 Jeong Sang-yong(정상영) : Secretary of External Affairs, handled the Negotiate between Martial Law Command
 Yoon Sang-won(윤상원) : Spokesperson for Militia
 Park Nam-sun(박남선) : Director of Militia Operations
 Yoon Seok-ru(윤석루) : Militia QRF Commander
 Lee Jae-ho(이재호) : Militia QRF Deputy Commander
 Kim Jun-bong(김준봉) : Director of Investigations, Prevent crime activities of criminals and sabotage activities of DSC assets who infiltrated in Gwangju
 Gu Seong-ju(구성주) : Director of Provisions Supply

Order in the city was well maintained, but negotiations came to a deadlock as the army urged the militias to immediately and unconditionally disarm themselves. This issue caused division within the Settlement Committees; some wanted immediate surrender, while others called for continued resistance until their demands were met. After heated debates, those calling for continued resistance eventually took control.

Protests in other regions 
As the news of the bloody crackdown spread, further protests against the government broke out in nearby regions, including Hwasun, Naju, Haenam, Mokpo, Yeongam, Gangjin, and Muan. While protests ended peacefully in most regions, in Haenam there were gunfights between armed protesters and troops. By May 24, most of these protests had died down; in Mokpo, protests continued until May 28.

May 26 
By May 26, the army was ready to reenter Gwangju. Members of the Citizens' Settlement Committee unsuccessfully tried to block the army's advance by lying down in the streets. As the news of the imminent attack spread, civil militias gathered in the Provincial Office, preparing for the last stand.

May 27 
The Martial Law Command decided to execute Operation Sangmu-Chungjeong (Operation Martialism and Loyalty) to quell the protests. The 3rd Airborne Brigade, 7th Airborne Brigade, and 11th Airborne Brigade Troopers armed with M16A1 and stun grenades and wearing flak vests, leaf camo helmets with white Band, ordinary ROK Army infantryman combat uniforms without any insignia and patches (instead of with ROK-SWC's Signature Noodle Camo pattern uniforms called Chungjeong bok (Loyalty Uniform) since the 1970s) were mobilized for the operation.

At 4:00 a.m., disguised troopers from three Airborne Brigades were in the vanguard of the operation. The 20th Mechanised Infantry Division and the 31st Infantry Division joined the Operation as backup reinforcements. Troops of Combat Arms Training Command's three subordinate units (Army Infantry School, Army Artillery School, Army Armor School) maintain their positions in the blockade during the operation.

The Airborne Brigade troopers moved into the downtown area and defeated the civil militias within 90 minutes.

Role of the police 
The  National Security Headquarters, initially dealt with controlling the protests, but was soon assisted by paratroopers from the 7th Airborne Brigade, before being ordered to evacuate and allow the army to fully take over duties in controlling unrest. The police suffered some of the first casualties of the uprising when four policemen were killed during a car-ramming attack. However, the martial law forces were also not friendly to the local police of Gwangju city.

Commissioner General of the Jeonnam Provincial Police, Ahn Byung-ha, refused to order policemen to open fire on civilians, as instructed by Chun Doo-hwan, leading to his eventual replacement as police chief, and subsequent torture by the Army Counterintelligence Corps, which in turn led to his death 8 years later. Moreover, some of the Paratroopers unreasonably assaulted the policemen. Kim Seung-ho, who was an ophthalmology resident of the Chonnam National University Hospital in May 1980 said "the hospital accommodation was located on the 11th Floor so I can see what is going on the outside. One day when I was looking in the direction of the Provincial Office Building, a group of soldiers chased the police officers. I saw the weird thing that police officers were threatened in the alley by soldiers trying to hunt them down."

As such, the police played little role in the violent suppression of the uprising, and several policemen were targeted by the army and government for expressing sympathies with protesters.

Casualties 

There is no universally accepted death toll for the Gwangju Uprising. Official figures released by the government's Martial Law Command shortly after the event put the death toll at 144 civilians, 22 troops and four police killed, with 127 civilians, 109 troops and 144 police wounded. Individuals who attempted to dispute these figures were liable for arrest for "spreading false rumors".

However, Gwangju's records of death in May 1980 were at least 2,300 above the monthly average.
According to the May 18 Family Association, at least 165 people died between May 18 and 27. Another 76 are still missing and presumed dead. Twenty-two soldiers and four policemen were killed during the uprising, including 13 soldiers killed in the friendly-fire incident between troops in Songam-dong. Figures for police casualties are likely to be higher, due to reports of several policemen being killed by soldiers for releasing captured protesters. Estimates for civilians wounded vary heavily, with some measuring around 1,800 to 3,500 wounded.

The official figures have been criticized by some as being too low. Based on reports by foreign press sources and critics of the Chun Doo-hwan administration, it has been argued that the actual death toll was in the 1000 to 2000 range.

Aftermath 

The government denounced the uprising as a rebellion instigated by Kim Dae-jung and his followers. In subsequent trials, Kim was convicted and sentenced to death, although his punishment was later reduced in response to international outcries. Overall, 1,394 people were arrested for involvement in the Gwangju incident, and 427 were indicted. Among them, 7 received death sentences and 12 received life sentences. It is estimated that up to 200,000 people may have participated in the uprising, at various stages, facing roughly 3,000 paratroopers and 18,000 policemen.

137 victims were carried in handcarts and garbage trucks to be buried at the Old Mangweol-dong Cemetery located on the outskirts of Gwangju. A New Mangweol-dong Cemetery was created by the state to educate on and commemorate Gwangju's history.

The Gwangju Uprising had a profound impact on South Korean politics and history. Chun Doo-hwan already had popularity problems due to his taking power through a military coup, but authorizing the dispatch of Special Forces paratroopers against citizens damaged his legitimacy even further. The movement preceded other democratic movements in the 1980s that pressured the regime into democratic reforms, paving the way for the election of oppositional candidate Kim Dae-Jung in 1997. 

On 3 December 1995, Chun and 16 others were arrested on charges of conspiracy and insurrection. On 17 April 1997, the judgment was finalized in the Supreme Court. Chun was officially convicted of leading an insurrection, conspiracy to commit insurrection, taking part in an insurrection, illegal troop movement orders, dereliction of duty during martial law, murder of superior officers, attempted murder of superior officers, murder of subordinate troops, leading a rebellion, conspiracy to commit rebellion, taking part in a rebellion, and murder for the purpose of rebellion, as well as assorted crimes relating to bribery.

Beginning in 2000, the May 18 Memorial Foundation has offered an annual Gwangju Prize for Human Rights to a notable human rights defender in memory of the uprising.

On May 25, 2011, the documents of Gwangju Uprising were listed as a 'UNESCO Memory of the World.’ (The official registration name of these documents is 'Human Rights Documentary Heritage 1980 Archives for the May 18th Democratic Uprising against Military Regime, in Gwangju, Republic of Korea.') It then became clear that there was an urgent need to systematically collect and preserve these documents. Gwangju Metropolitan City government then decided to establish May 18 Archives by legislating an ordinance known as the 'Management Act on the Archives of May 18 Gwangju Democratization Movement. Since then, the Gwangju Metropolitan City government decided to re-model the former Gwangju Catholic center building for record conservation. The construction of this facility started in 2014 and was completed in 2015.

Anti-Americanism 
The 1980s marked a surge in Anti-Americanism in Korea, widely traced to the events of May 1980 due to the United States' support for Chun's government. According to Bruce Cumings:

Gwangju convinced a new generation of young [Koreans] that the democratic movement had developed not with the support of Washington, as an older generation of more conservative Koreans thought, but in the face of daily American support for any dictator who could quell the democratic aspirations of the Korean people. The result was an anti-American movement in the 1980s that threatened to bring down the whole structure of American support for the ROK. American cultural centers were burned to the ground (more than once in Gwangju); students immolated themselves in protest of Reagan's support for Chun.

Fundamental to this movement was a perception of U.S. complicity in Chun's rise to power, and, more particularly, in the Gwangju Uprising itself. These matters remain controversial. It is clear, for example, that the U.S. authorized the ROK Army's 20th Division to retake Gwangju – as acknowledged in a 1982 letter to the New York Times by then-Ambassador William H. Gleysteen.

[General John A. Wickham], with my concurrence, permitted the transfer of well-trained troops of the twentieth ROKA Division from martial-law duty in Seoul to Gwangju because law and order had to be restored in a situation that had run amok following the outrageous behavior of the Korean Special Forces, which had never been under General Wickham's command.

However, as Gwangju Uprising editors Scott-Stokes and Lee note, whether the expulsion of government troops left the situation lawless or "amok" is open to dispute.
But the gravest questions pertain to the initial, triggering use of South Korean special forces. The United States has always denied foreknowledge of their deployment, most definitively in a June 19, 1989 white paper; that report additionally downplays Gleysteen's and others' characterizations of the U.S. actions.

...Ambassador Gleysteen has stated that the U.S. "approved" the movement of the 20th Division, and a U.S. Department of Defense spokesman on May 23, 1980, stated that the U.S. had "agreed" to release from OPCON [operational control] of the troops sent to Gwangju. Irrespective of the terminology, under the rights of national sovereignty the ROKG had the authority to deploy the 20th Division as it saw fit, once it had OPCON, regardless of the views of the U.S. Government."Ex-Leaders Go on Trial in Seoul"

Re-evaluation 

At the Mangwol-dong cemetery in Gwangju where victims' bodies were buried, survivors of the democratization movement and bereaved families have held an annual memorial service on May 18 every year since 1980 called the May Movement (O-wol Undong). Many pro-democracy demonstrations in the 1980s demanded official recognition of the truth of the uprising and punishment for those responsible.

Official reevaluation began after the reinstatement of direct presidential elections in 1987. In 1988, the National Assembly held a public hearing on the Gwangju Uprising and officially renamed the incident the Gwangju Uprising. While the official renaming occurred in 1987, it can also be found translated into English as "Gwangju People's Uprising".

Prosecutions
In 1995, as public pressure mounted, the National Assembly passed the Special Law on May 18 Democratization Movement, which enabled the prosecution of those responsible for the December 12 coup d'état and Gwangju Uprising although the statute of limitations had run out.

In 1996, eight politicians including Chun Doo-hwan and Roh Tae-woo were indicted for high treason and the massacre. Their punishments were settled in 1997, including a death sentence, which was commuted to a life sentence, for Chun Doo-hwan. Former President Roh Tae-Woo, Chun's successor and fellow participant in the December 12 coup, was sentenced to 22.5 years, which was reduced to 17 years on appeal. However, all convicts were pardoned in the name of national reconciliation on December 22, 1997, by President Kim Young-sam, based on advice from President-elect Kim Dae-jung.

Developments from 1997 to 2013
In 1997, May 18 was declared an official memorial day. In 2002, a law privileging bereaved families took effect, and the Mangwol-dong cemetery was elevated to the status of a national cemetery.

On May 18, 2013, President Park Geun-hye attended the 33rd anniversary of the Gwangju uprising and stated, "I feel the sorrow of family members and the city of Gwangju every time I visit the National May 18 Cemetery", and that "I believe achieving a more mature democracy is a way to repay the sacrifice paid by those [killed in the massacre]."

2017 investigation
After Park Geun-hye's impeachment and removal from office, newly elected South Korean President Moon Jae-in vowed to reopen the investigation into the South Korean government's role in the suppression of the uprising in May 2017.

In February 2018, it was revealed for the first time that the army had used McDonnell Douglas MD 500 Defender and Bell UH-1 Iroquois helicopters to fire on civilians. Defense Minister Song Young-moo delivered an apology.

On November 7, 2018, Defense Minister Jeong Kyeong-doo issued another apology for the South Korean military's role in suppressing the uprising and acknowledged that soldiers had engaged in acts of sexual violence during the crackdown as well.

In May 2019, Kim Yong-Jang, a former intelligence officer at the 501st Military Intelligence Brigade of the U.S. Army testified that Chun Doo-hwan personally ordered troops to shoot protesters based on the intelligence he saw at the time. According to Kim, Chun secretly came to Gwangju on May 21, 1980, by helicopter to meet four military leaders including Chung Ho-Yong, then-commander of special operations, and Lee Jae-woo, then-colonel of the Gwangju 505 security unit. Kim also said there were undercover soldiers among the Gwangju citizens acting as agents provocateurs to discredit the movement. The soldiers were "in their 20s and 30s with short hair, some wearing wigs" and "their faces were burnt and some wore worn-out clothes".

2020 Truth Commission
In May 2020, 40 years after the uprising, the independent May 18 Democratization Movement Truth Commission was launched to investigate the crackdown and use of military force. Under legislation passed in 2018, it would operate for two years, with a one-year extension allowed if necessary. In an interview held to mark the 40th anniversary, President Moon announced his support for inscribing the historic value and significance of the May 18 Democratization Movement in a new constitution of South Korea following the liberals' landslide victory in the 2020 National Assembly elections.

May 18 Special Act
Subsequently, with its new three-fifths majority in the National Assembly, the Democratic Party implemented a series of reforms that were approved by the National Assembly in December 2020 including revisions to the May 18 Special Act, penalizing those involved in making false factual claims regarding the 1980 Gwangju Uprising.

Revelations of U.S. foreknowledge
Declassified United States Department of State documents in July 2021, requested by the South Korean government, revealed that the U.S. ambassador William H. Gleysteen was informed by the Chief Presidential Secretary Choi Kwang-soo of the plans for an army crackdown on 26 May 1980, a day before it took place. The diplomatic cables showed Gleysteen expressed Washington's concerns over growing anti-American sentiment in and around the Gwangju area, amid "broadcasts" asserting that the U.S. was involved in the military crackdown. Prior to the declassification, the notion of American foreknowledge and involvement in the Gwangju Massacre was already immediately known after the event, but had been officially denied by the United States.

In popular culture

Literature 
 Human Acts (novel) by Han Kang, translated by Deborah Smith, Portobello Books, (January 6, 2016). 
 The Old Garden (novel) by Hwang Sok-yong, translated by Jay Oh, Seven Stories Press (June 1, 2009). 
 I'll Be Right There (novel) by Shin Kyung-sook, translated by Sora Kim-Russell, Other Press (June 3, 2014). 
 There a Petal Silently Falls: Three Stories by Ch'oe Yun, translated by Bruce Fulton and Ju-Chan Fulton, Columbia University Press (May 31, 2008). 
 The Seed of Joy (novel) by William Amos 
 Dance Dance Revolution (poetry) by Cathy Park Hong, W. W. Norton Company (May 17, 2007).

Compositions 
 "Exemplum in memoriam Kwangju" for large orchestra by Isang Yun

Television
 Sandglass (1995)
 5th Republic (2005)
 Reply 1988 (2015-2016)
 Youth of May (2021)
 Snowdrop (South Korean TV series) (2022)

Film 
 1987: When the Day Comes
 26 Years (film) (based on 2006 manhwa serialized online by Kang Full)
 The Attorney
 Fork Lane
 May 18 (film)
 Peppermint Candy
 A Petal (1996 film) (adapted from the short story "There a Petal Silently Falls" by Choe Yun)
 Symphonic Poem for the Beloved (DPRK Video Archive on YouTube)
 Sunny (2011 film)
 A Taxi Driver (2017 film)
 The Man Standing Next
 National Security 1985 (2012 film)
 Hunt (2022 film)

Music videos
 "That's My Fault" (Drama Version) by SPEED feat. Davichi's Kang Min-kyung
 "It's Over" (Drama Version) by SPEED feat. Park Bo-young
 "May" by Wings of the ISANG

See also 

 Bu-Ma Democratic Protests
 Busan American Cultural Service building arson
 Coup d'état of December Twelfth
 Coup d'état of May Eighteenth
 Gukpung 81
 
 June Democratic Struggle
 Jürgen Hinzpeter
 May 18th National Cemetery
 May 18 Memorial Foundation

Citations

General references

Further reading

External links 

 The May 18 Memorial Foundation (in Korean and English)
 1980: The Kwangju uprising – article with comments on the self-administration people developed.
 Kwangju: Citizen's response to state violence (AHRC HRCS Educational Module)
 Kwangju: People's perseverance in seeking justice (AHRC HRCS Educational Module)
 Kwangju: A flame of Democracy (by Sanjeewa Liyanage)
 Photo gallery
 "Lingering legacy of Korean massacre", BBC News, May 18, 2005.
 "May 18 Documents - U.S. Embassy & Consulate in the Republic of Korea"
 "United States Government Statement on the Events in Kwangju, Republic of Korea, in May 1980" , June 19, 1989
 Hwaryeohan Hyuga (A Magnificent Holiday) – official website for the 2007 movie about the Gwangju Uprising
 "Ex-Leaders Go On Trial In Seoul" – A February 27, 1996 review of the Cherokee Files (contemporaneous with ex-presidents Chun and Roh's trials)
 Bibliography of Kwangju Uprising in English
 Facebook memorial page (in Korean)

 
Protests in South Korea
Massacres committed by South Korea
1980 in South Korea
1980 murders in South Korea
Chun Doo-hwan
Conflicts in 1980
Fourth Republic of Korea
Far-right terrorism
Far-right politics in South Korea
Filmed killings
History of Gwangju
Human rights abuses in South Korea
Mass murder in 1980
May 1980 events in Asia
Political repression in South Korea
Protest-related deaths
Social movements in South Korea
South Korean democracy movements
Student protests in South Korea
Urban warfare
Fifth Republic of Korea